The Russian Orthodox Army, ROA (Russkaya pravoslavnaya armiya) was a Russian separatist paramilitary group in Ukraine that has been fighting Ukrainian forces in the Donbas War. It was founded in 2014. The ROA was later absorbed into the Oplot Fifth Separate Infantry Brigade.

Background

The Russian Orthodox Army was one of the number of pro-Russian separatist militia units in the Donbas region described as "pro-Tsarist", "extremist" Eastern Orthodox Christian.

Since the onset of insurgency in Ukraine in the early 2014, many central figures in Donetsk have been referred to be directly or indirectly related to Russian National Unity (RNU), most notably Pavel Gubarev, a prominent spokesman with multiple titles (leader of the Donbas militia, governor of the Donetsk People’s Republic, its foreign affairs minister, and the founder of the New Russia Party), who besides stating ROA was organised by RNU under his control also declared himself leader of the RNE section in Donetsk. Exactly when the RNE affiliates were created in Ukraine has not been possible to establish. Historian Marlène Laruelle states that while there are suspicions of former RNU-leader Barkashov being close to commander Verin, no reliable sources in Ukraine can verify that, and ROA's own Facebook page displayed no direct connection with RNE.

The ROA reportedly had 4,000 members according to Russian journalists, while eyewitnesses estimated their membership to be at 500.

Engagements

Notable engagements of the ROA include the June 2014 skirmishes in Mariupol and Amvrosiivka Raion. The headquarters of the ROA is located in an occupied Security Service of Ukraine (SBU) building in Donetsk city. Members had no special training apart from the usual conscription service in the army and swore allegiance to Igor Girkin ("Strelkov"), insurgent and Minister of Defence of the self-declared Donetsk People's Republic, as of January, 2017.

Religious persecution
Along with other separatist groups in the region, the ROA has been accused of "kidnapp[ing], beat[ing], and threaten[ing] Protestants, Catholics, and members of the Ukrainian Orthodox Church… as well as participat[ing] in anti-Semitic acts."

In late November 2014, the group gained attention after abducting prominent Ukrainian Greek Catholic priest, Sergeii Kulbaka, and Roman Catholic priest, Father Pawel Witek. According to the Defence Ministry of Ukraine, the ROA has also been in conflict with another pro-Russian militia, the Vostok Battalion, which accused the ROA of looting, and of avoiding combat.

Aftermath

In September 2014, the ROA changed its format and joined the new Oplot Fifth Separate Infantry Brigade.

Notes

References

Separatist forces of the war in Donbas
Military units and formations established in 2014
Organizations designated as terrorist by Ukraine
Pro-Russian militant groups
Paramilitary organizations based in Ukraine
Anti-Catholic organizations